Ludwig von Lüder (4 February 1795 – 6 March 1862) was a Bavarian Major General. He was War Minister under Maximilian II of Bavaria for two times.

Biography 
Lüder was born in the district of Kusel. He took part in the campaigns of the Bavarian army from 1813 to 1815. He was advanced to an Oberleutnant in 1818, to a Captain in 1827, and was inspector of the artillery troops from 1832 to 1836, serving in the Bavarian Auxiliary Corps in Greece. In 1838 he became corps adjutant in the Generalquartiermeister staff, and in 1842 he became head of artillery division in the Bavarian war ministry. He was advanced to an Oberstleutnant in 1844, and four years later to the rank of an Oberst. In 1848 he became Major General and commander in chief of the Munich garrison. After his period as war minister from 29 May 1849 to 25 March 1855, Lüder served again as commander in chief of Munich for a short time, before he was war minister for a second time after 13 April 1859. On 12 June 1861 he was retired at his own request. He died in Munich the following year.

References and notes 

Bavarian Ministers of War
Bavarian generals
People from the Kingdom of Bavaria
1795 births
1862 deaths
German military personnel of the Napoleonic Wars
Germany–Greece military relations